Shilveh, also rendered as Shelveh, may refer to:
 Shilveh-ye Olya
 Shilveh-ye Sofla